The Vario-Sonnar T* 24–70 mm f/2.8 ZA SSM (SAL-2470Z) is a high-quality zoom lens compatible with cameras using the Sony α, and Minolta AF lens mounts. It was designed and is manufactured by Sony in Japan in collaboration with Carl Zeiss.

See also
 Zeiss Vario-Sonnar

Sources

24-70
24-70
24-70
Camera lenses introduced in 2008